Arabia is an unincorporated community in Wabash Township, Parke County, in the U.S. state of Indiana.

History
Arabia was probably founded in the 1820s.

Geography

References

Unincorporated communities in Parke County, Indiana
Unincorporated communities in Indiana